Don't Tread on Me is the eighth studio album by 311, which was released on August 16, 2005. The first single, "Don't Tread on Me", was released to radio on July 26, 2005.  It peaked at #2 on the Billboard Modern Rock Tracks and #1 on the R&R Panel Alternative chart. The second single, "Speak Easy", was released on November 22, 2005 and a third "Frolic Room", was released on June 13, 2006.

Don't Tread on Me debuted and peaked at #5 on the Billboard 200, selling 91,000 copies in its first week of release. Despite the success of the leadoff single, the album, like its predecessor Evolver, has yet to receive an RIAA certification.

This is the third 311 album recorded in 311's recording studio The Hive in North Hollywood, California.

Track listing

Personnel 
Credits adapted from album’s liner notes.

311
Nick Hexum – vocals, rhythm guitar
S.A. Martinez – vocals
Chad Sexton – drums, percussion
Tim Mahoney – lead guitar
P-Nut – bass

Additional Musicians
Robert Greenidge - pans on "Speak Easy"

Production
311 – producer
Ron Saint Germain - producer, engineer, mixer
Giff Tripp – assistant engineer
David Kahne – additional pre-production
Jason Walters – studio manager
Bryan Manley – studio technician
Joe Gastwirt – mastering
Shepard Fairey – artwork, design
Myriam Santos-Kayda – photography
Pablo Mathiason – A&R

Chart performance

Album

Singles

References

External links
 

2005 albums
311 (band) albums
Volcano Entertainment albums
Albums produced by Ron Saint Germain